The Remington Model 11-96, also known as the Euro Lightweight, is a gas-operated semi-automatic shotgun produced from 1996 to 1999 by Remington Arms. It was named 1997 shotgun of the year by Shooting Industry magazine.

The Model 11-96 was a lightened version of the Model 11-87. It was available only in 12 gauge, accepting  or  shells. It was shipped with three choke tubes.

References

Remington Arms firearms
Semi-automatic shotguns of the United States
Weapons and ammunition introduced in 1996